Hsum Hsai is a village in the Nawnghkio Township, in northern Shan State of Myanmar, located approximately 60 km north-east of Mandalay.

Populated places in Shan State